The International Cooperative Alliance (ICA) is a non-governmental cooperative organization  founded in 1895 to unite, represent and serve cooperatives worldwide. The ICA is the custodian of the internationally recognised definition, values and principles of a cooperative in the ICA Statement on the Cooperative Identity. The ICA represents 315 co-operative federation and organisations in 107 countries.

The ICA provides a global voice and forum for knowledge, expertise and coordinated action for and about cooperatives. The members of the ICA are international and national cooperative organisations from all sectors of the economy, including agriculture, banking, consumer, fisheries, health, housing, insurance, industry and services. The ICA has members from more than 100 countries, and it is estimated to represent one billion individuals worldwide. Cooperatives are values-based businesses owned by their members. Whether they are customers, employees or residents, the members get an equal say in the business and a share of the profits.

At the United Nations, the ICA participates in high-level discussions of relevance to cooperatives through its consultative status with the United Nations Economic and Social Council (ECOSOC), which it has had since 1946, the first non-governmental organisation to do so. The ICA also has individual partnership agreements with the Food and Agriculture Organization of the United Nations (FAO), the International Labour Organization (ILO), and participates in the UN Inter-Agency Task Force on Social and Solidarity Economy (UNTFSSE). Since 1971, the ICA has been a founding member of the Committee for the Promotion and Advancement of Cooperatives (COPAC), a UN multi-stakeholder partnership of global public and private institutions that promotes and advocates for people-centred, self-sustaining cooperative enterprises, guided by the principles of economic, social and environmental sustainable development.

The ICA has been participating in the G20 Engagement Groups since 2014, having representatives in the taskforces and contributing actively to the discussions and preparation of documents. In 2020, the ICA created the Cooperative G20 Working Group to bring the cooperative movement's voices to the G20 Engagement Groups through their contribution in drafting policy papers, background materials, and advocacy documents to show their involvement and contribution in resolving issues addressed by the G20 Summit.

In 2006 the ICA published the first major index of the world's largest cooperative and mutual enterprises, the ICA Global 300, which demonstrated the scale of the cooperative movement globally. Since 2011, together with European Research Institute on Cooperative and Social Enterprises (EURICSE), the ICA Global 300 has evolved into the World Cooperative Monitor, a project designed to collect robust economic, organizational, and social data about cooperatives worldwide. The publication reports on the world’s largest cooperatives and mutuals, or groups of coop­eratives and mutuals, including rankings of the Top 300 and sectoral analysis. Since 2018, each edition has also a thematic focus, in 2022 it was dedicated to the digitalization and the cooperative identity.

The ICA created in 2018 the International Cooperative Entrepreneurship Think Tank (ICETT) to boost cooperatives' entrepreneurial performance. Through innovative ideas, research, education, and cooperation, its members address the global challenges that cooperative enterprises are facing today.

On the first Saturday of July each year, the ICA coordinates celebrations of International Day of Cooperatives.

In December 2009, the United Nations declared 2012 as the International Year of Cooperatives.

The ICA launched its 2020-2030 Strategic Plan, named “A People-Centred Path to a Second Cooperative Decade”, based on the earlier Blueprint for a Cooperative Decade, and providing strategic guidance to the ICA and its bodies for the 2020-2030 decade. This Strategic Plan is based on 22 months of preparatory work, including two surveys with the whole ICA membership, two consultations with the ICA bodies (Regions, Sectoral Organizations, Thematic Committees and Youth Network) and several days of meetings and written consultations within the ICA Board.

Structure
The ICA consists of a 20-member governing board, a General Assembly, four regions (one each for Africa, Europe, Asia-Pacific, and Americas), eight sectoral organisations and five thematic committees.

General Assembly
The General Assembly is one of the ICA’s governing bodies. It is the highest authority of the ICA, constituted of representatives from its member organisations. It is convened at least one a year with a possible extraordinary assembly being held if the Board were asked by more than one-fifth of the members,or by members who represent at least one-fifth of the total number of votes, or by the statutory auditor.

ICA Regional Organisations
 ICA Asia-Pacific - based in New Delhi, India
 ICA Africa - based in Nairobi, Kenya
 Cooperatives Europe - based in Brussels, Belgium
 ICA Americas - based in San José, Costa Rica

Sectoral Organisations
 International Cooperative Agricultural Organisation (ICAO)
 Consumer Cooperatives Worldwide (CCW)
 International Cooperative Fisheries Organisation (ICFO)
 International Health Cooperative Organisation (IHCO)
 International Cooperative Housing Organisation (ICA Housing)
 International Cooperative and Mutual Insurance Federation (ICMIF)
 International Organisation of Industrial, Artisanal and Service Producers' Cooperatives (CICOPA)
 International Cooperative Banking Association. (ICBA)

Thematic Committees

Committee on Cooperative Research
The ICA Committee on Cooperative Research (ICA CCR) is a bridge between academic research and the cooperative world. The ICA CCR aims to raise awareness of cooperative research, particularly to managers and cooperators so that it can be applied effectively to current cooperative issues. One of the main activities of the CCR is the organisation of research conferences at the global and regional levels, including the biennial Global Research Conference.

Cooperative Law Committee
The Cooperative Law Committee gives independent advice to the ICA on cooperative law, broadly defined to include all legal rules that shape the cooperative institution and regulate its operations.

International Cooperative Development Platform
The International Cooperative Alliance Development Platform (ICADP) is the ICA Committee that brings together cooperative organisations active in international development. Its mission is to promote the cooperative model within international development policies and programs, as well as to enhance collaboration across regions both inside and outside the cooperative movement.ICADP serves as a forum for discussion and exchange of experiences and knowledge on international cooperative development.

Gender Equality Committee
The Gender Equality Committee of the ICA (ICA GEC) is a catalyst for change to make gender equality a reality in all cooperatives and serves as a forum for the discussion and exchange of experiences and ideas on issues related to gender equality. It promotes equality between women and men and gender integration in the cooperative movement and society.

ICA Youth Committee (constituted 2021)
The ICA’s Youth Committee aims to help young cooperators from different countries to connect, share experiences and ideas, as well as to provide an environment where young cooperators can learn more about the wider cooperative movement. Involving young people from outside the movement through education and support is a key focus of the work of this network. The network also looks to empower young cooperators to engage with the rest of the movement to both raise the profile of youth issues and to ensure the youth perspective is presented during wider discussions.

Statement on the Cooperative Identity
The Statement on the Cooperative Identity, promulgated by the ICA, defines and guides cooperatives worldwide. It contains the definition of a cooperative as a special form of organization, the values of cooperatives, and the currently accepted cooperative principles (the Rochdale Principles) that direct their behavior and operation. The Statement with the latest revision of the cooperative principles was adopted by ICA in 1995.

Consultation on the #CoopIdentity
The 33rd World Cooperative Congress, with the theme Deepening Our Cooperative Identity, initiated a consultative process to explore cooperators’ understanding of the Statement and to examine how well it has stood the test of time. 

Following on from the Congress, the ICA Board set up the Cooperative Identity Advisory Group (CIAG) to continue the reflection and consultation on the cooperative identity. The Group comprises 23 persons from all ICA regions and is chaired by ICA board member Alexandra Wilson from Canada.

On 13 May 2022, the ICA hosted a webinar to share the main takeaways from the 33rd World Cooperative Congress, promote the global consultation on the Statement on the Cooperative Identity, and bring together cooperators and the cooperatives branch of the International Labour organisation (ILO) ahead of the 110th Session of the International Labour Conference and the International Day of Cooperatives. 

Up to 31 October, cooperators worldwide had a chance to answer a survey gathering opinions on whether the cooperative identity is well defined and understood. Cooperators in 136 different countries answered the survey. On 14 December 2022, the CIAG organised a webinar entitled ‘Sharing the results of the survey on the Cooperative Identity’, unveiling the findings of the survey. 

Other seminars and online events to explore the cooperative identity will follow in 2023. From now to 2024–2025 when the consultation will conclude with decisions from the ICA General Assembly, the following steps are foreseen:
 The CIAG will reflect on the feedback and ideas garnered through the consultation process.
 The ICA Global Board will deliberate on the advice from CIAG and the Cooperative Identity Committee Board, reporting to ICA members.
 ICA members will make the final decision at one or more general assemblies.
For more information, visit https://coopidentity.ica.coop/.

The flag
 
ICA adopted its original rainbow flag in 1925, with the seven colors symbolizing unity in diversity and the power of light, enlightenment, and progress.

The rainbow ICA flag is now superseded with the current version in plum background and a white ICA logo in the center.

The International Day of Cooperatives
Marked by cooperatives worldwide since 1923 and officially proclaimed by the United Nations General Assembly on the centenary of the ICA in 1995, the International Day of Cooperatives (#CoopsDay) is celebrated annually on the first Saturday of July. 

The aim of #CoopsDay is to increase awareness of cooperatives and promote the movement's ideas of international solidarity, economic efficiency, equality, and world peace. Since 1995, the ICA and the United Nations through Committee for the Promotion and Advancement of Cooperatives (COPAC) have jointly set the theme for the celebration of #CoopsDay.

Through #CoopsDay, local, national and global policymakers, civil-society organisations and the public in general can learn about the contribution of cooperatives to a secure future for all.

Presidents
1895: Earl Grey and Henry William Wolff
1907: Earl Grey and William Maxwell
1917: William Maxwell
1921: G. J. D. C. Goedhart
1927: Väinö Tanner
1945: Robert Palmer
1948: Harry Gill
1955: Marcel Brot
1960: Mauritz Bonow
1975: Roger Kerinec
1984: Lars Marcus
1995: Graham Melmoth
1997: Roberto Rodrigues
2001: Ivano Barberini
2009: Pauline Green
2015: Monique F. Leroux
2017: Ariel Guarco

Secretaries
1895: Edward Owen Greening
1902: Jesse Clement Gray
1908: Hans Müller
1913: Henry John May
1939: Gertrude Polley
1963: Position abolished

Director-Generals

until 2010: Iain Macdonald
2010 - 2018: Charles Gould
2018 - 2023: Bruno Roelants

The Cooperative marque and .coop
Since 2001, DotCooperation has united the cooperative community through a shared online identity and platform where cooperative organizations can participate, inform, educate, and pioneer a path for others to join and support the cooperative movement. 

DotCooperation empowers cooperatives to participate and thrive in the digital economy with identity tools and resources. Identity tools include .coop domain names and the Cooperative Marque, sector domain names. Resources include the .coop Global Directory and the Digital Empowerment Learning Hub.

DotCooperation is jointly owned by the International Cooperative Alliance (ICA) and NCBA-CLUSA (National Cooperative Business Association-CLUSA International), two non-profit organizations with a mission to develop the global cooperative movement.

Every cooperative that uses a .coop domain name as the primary address for their website elevates their cooperative identity, principles, and purpose. It unites the cooperative movement online with a shared identity. It transforms an organization’s value from a lone contributor to an active participant of a global online network of cooperatives. All cooperatives verify their identity when selecting a .coop domain name. 

The Cooperative Marque is used by coops around the world to support the cooperative movement. It is used as a cooperative community badge, alongside your own brand identity. The Marque can be used on your mobile app, website, newsletters, email signature, publications, promotions, packaging, merchandise and signage.

Together, .coop and the Cooperative Marque are symbols of the global cooperative movement and our collective identity. They differentiate your cooperative from a private or investor-owned business.

ICA World Cooperative Congress

1895 - London 
The first International Cooperative Congress was held on 19-23 August 1895 in London. Delegates from several countries were in attendance at the first World Cooperative Congress in London in 1895. Cooperators from countries including Argentina, Australia, Belgium, England, Denmark, France, Germany, Holland, India, Italy, Switzerland, Serbia, and the USA traveled to Britain to take part in a historic moment for the global cooperative movement.

1896 - Paris 
During the Congress, an international trade exhibition was set up in the premises of the Musée Social to foster collaboration between producer and consumer cooperatives in various countries.

1897 - Delft 
A resolution on women's participation in cooperatives was passed on this Congress, calling for cooperatives to delete rules which hindered women's admission to cooperatives on their election to committees and boards.

1900 - Paris 
On the paper that was presented in this Congress, it suggested to strengthen the communication between the Alliance and its members and it recommended sending fraternal delegates to other cooperative movements' Congresses.

1902 - Manchester 
During this Congress, delegates visited Rochdale, and a lecture on the Rochdale Pioneers was delivered during this visit.

1904 - Budapest 
The Congress discussed cooperatives' relations with the State because much of the Congress was concerned about how undeveloped cooperative movements could be assisted, either by the State or by stronger cooperative movements.

1907 - Cremona 
In this Congress, each country is invited to set up a Cooperative Wholesale Society and an International Committee of Cooperative Wholesale Societies for Joint-Buying.

1910 - Hamburg 
The Report of the Central Committee on the ICA's work gave information on the establishment of the monthly International Cooperative Bulletin in 1908; on membership expansion; on new publications; and on the establishment of the International Cooperative Library and of the Centre for the Collection and Supply of Lantern Slides.

1913 - Glasgow 
It was the last Congress to be held before the start of the First World War a year later. In this Congress, the ICA passed its most notable Peace Resolution, which set its attitudes not only to the coming war, but events way beyond.

1921 - Basel 
Great personal relations between the ICA leaders were maintained despite the length and bitterness of the war. The ICA Executive's concern to avoid political splits within the ICA caused it to take a strictly neutral line

1924 - Ghent 
An exhibition was set up in which cooperative movements from 32 countries participated. A sculpture was commisssioned to depict a group of working men and women supporting the Globe and representing the act of cooperation. The silver version of this still remains in the ICA Head Office to the present day.

1927 - Stockholm 
A further aspect of this Congress was that it reflected the growing maturity and stability of the ICA. For example, there was an increase in the matters reported to Congress and questions which were handled by resolution. Both became part of the policy-making process of the ICA.

1930 - Vienna 
This was an important Congress because it initiated the 1930s review of Rochdale Principles.

1934 - London 
The Central Committee's Report contained a wealth of information on the work of the ICA in this Congress. The progress made in research, especially in collecting statistics, in issuing new publications, the success of special conferences on education and on the cooperative press and cooperative summer schools were reported on.

1937 - Paris 
The Cooperative Principles are reviewed and amended for the first time in this Congress.

1946 - Zürich 
In this period of time, the ICA made an attempt to gain recognition with pre-UN organisations such as the UN's Relief and Rehabilitation Agency (UNRRA), and the UN Conference on Food and Agriculture (FAO). In 1946, the ICA gain consultative status with the UN's economic and Social Council.

1948 - Prague 
The Central Committee's report covered the years from 1946 to 1948 and contained a detailed account of ICA Relief and Rehabilitation Fund and its participation in the work of the United Nations bodies.

1951 - Copenhagen 
The main concerns in this Congress were the collaboration with the UN organisations and the duty of cooperative movement to reduce differences in standards of living and economic development between developed and less-developed countries.

1954 - Paris 
A new Housing Committee was established in this Congress. Equally new was the Liaison Committee of the ICA and the International Committee of Women's Guilds (ICWG).

1957 - Stockholm 
Three papers had been presented in this Congress. The first one is the Progress of International Techinal Assistance by David Owen, the second paper is the Role of Governments in Less-Developed Countries by W.J. Chessman, and the third paper is the Promotion of Cooperation in less Developed Countries by B.J. Patel.

1960 - Lausanne 
This Congress took place during a period marked by technological achievements, fear of a Third World War, the granting of independence to various countries, desire for economic development and higher standards of living, and the creation by the UN of its Special Fund for Economic Development.

1963 - Bournemouth 
One of the most important decisions taken by this Congress was introduced the resolution moved by Soviet Member Organisation, Centrosoyus. It was decided to constitute a Commission to reformulate the Fundamental Principles of Cooperation under modern conditions and to include them in Agenda for the 23rd ICA Congress.

1966 - Vienna 
On this Congress, the ICA declaration on International Cooperative Day had placed emphasis on the development, and the role of the Cooperative Movement in achieving economic and social progress.

1969 - Hamburg 
On this occasion of the 75th Anniversary of the ICA, the President recalled the successive stages of the ICA since 1895. In the report about the Development Programme, it was said that the ICA's Declaration on International Cooperative Day made an appraisal of UN Resolution 2459 and the collaboration of the ICA with the UN Specialised Agencies and other Organisations, particularly in South East Asia and Africa.

1972 - Warsaw 
Two main papers were presented in this Congress that was held in Warsaw, Poland: the first on the emergence of Multi-National Corporations, the second on the International Technical Assistance.

1976 - Paris 
Membership had increased since the last Congress, with 166 Member Organisations from 66 countries, representing more than 300 million people.

1980 - Moscow 
The Congress had decided to establish a Regional Office for West-Africa. The official inauguration took place one year later, in March 1981.

1984 - Hamburg 
In 1984, the ICA had 165 members plus 8 international cooperative organisations from 70 countries. The establishment of the Regional Office for West Africa had become operational in 1981 and served 16 countries.

1988 - Stockholm 
By 1988, Housing, Consumer, Agriculture and Banking Committees received secretarial services from a Liaison Officer.

1992 - Tokyo 
In the Secretariat Report, the Structure Committee had identified five priorities; promoting and defending values shared by the ICA Members, stimulating the interchange of ideas and collaboration, spreading information about the cooperative system, acting as a catalyst for cooperative development, and speaking on behalf of ICA members with international organisations and governmental authorities.

1995 - Manchester 
The ICA Statement on the Cooperative Identity was adopted on this Congress. This event added Cooperative Values and a seventh principle, "Concern for Community"

2012 - Manchester 
The United Nations General Assembly declared 2012 as the International Year of Cooperatives, honouring the contribution of cooperatives to socio-economic development, particularly their impact on poverty reduction, employment generation and social integration.

2021 - Seoul 
The 33rd World Cooperative Congress marked both the 125th anniversary of the ICA, which was founded in 1895 at its first Congress in London, and the 25th anniversary of the adoption of the ICA Statement on the Cooperative Identity. The Seoul Congress kicked off a consultative process aimed at finding out how well the Statement on the Cooperative Identity has stood the test of time. An exhibition and a history publication were launched at the occasion of the congress.

See also
 List of Cooperative Federations

References

External links
The International Cooperative Alliance
The story of the ICA flag

Cooperative federations
Organizations established in 1895
Organisations based in Brussels